is a former Japanese football player.

Club statistics

References

External links

Profile at Vissel Kobe 

1986 births
Living people
Ryutsu Keizai University alumni
Association football people from Kōchi Prefecture
Japanese footballers
J1 League players
J2 League players
Vissel Kobe players
Matsumoto Yamaga FC players
Association football midfielders